The black-cheeked warbler (Basileuterus melanogenys) is a New World warbler, resident breeding bird endemic to the Talamancan montane forests of Costa Rica and western Panama.

It is normally found in oak forests with a dense bamboo understory from 2500 m altitude to the timberline, but occasionally occurs as low as 1600 m. The breeding pair builds a bulky domed nest with a side entrance on a sloping bank or in a gully, and the female lays two white eggs.

The black-cheeked warbler is 13–13.5 cm long and weighs 13 g.  It has a rufous crown, long white supercilia and black cheeks. The upperparts are dull olive, the breast is olive-grey, and the belly is yellow-white. The sexes are similar, but the young bird is browner on the upperparts, has a dull supercilium, a greyer breast, and shows two cinnamon wingbars.

Despite this species’ restricted range, it has three subspecies.

 B. m. melanogenys, the nominate race described above, breeds in central and southern Costa Rica.
 B. m. eximius is highly localised in a small area of western Panama, and is slightly whiter on the belly than melanogenys.
 B. m. bensoni is highly localised in a small area of west-central Panama, and is whiter below than eximius, and a purer grey above.

The black-cheeked warbler primarily feeds on insects, spiders and other small invertebrates, taken low in the undergrowth.

The call note of the black-cheeked warbler is a hard tsit, and the male's song is a lisping spluttered tsi tsi wee tsi tsi wu tsi wee.

References

 Curson, Quinn and Beadle,New World Warblers 
 Stiles and Skutch,  A guide to the birds of Costa Rica 

black-cheeked warbler
Birds of the Talamancan montane forests
black-cheeked warbler
black-cheeked warbler